Li Yuan (born 31 October 1951), better known by his pen name Hsiao Yeh, is a Taiwanese novelist and screenwriter.

Early life and education
Li's family is of Hakka descent and originates from Wuping County, moving to Taiwan in 1949. Li Yuan was born in Monga, Taipei, on 31 October 1951. His father was a statistician and his mother taught writing at National Taiwan Normal University, later becoming a journalist. Li's father gave his eldest son the pen name Hsiao Yeh, and both parents encouraged him to write. Li read classics such as  War and Peace and The Old Man and the Sea at the age of 11, at the behest of his father and was forced to write reports on them afterward, though Li preferred to draw cartoons and perform plays instead.

After studying biology at NTNU, Li earned a graduate degree in microbiology from the State University of New York at Buffalo in the United States. Upon his return to Taiwan, Li became a teaching assistant at National Yang Ming University.

Career
Hsiao Yeh published his first book in 1974, and was hired by the Central Motion Picture Corporation in 1981. In 1986, Hsiao Yeh won his first Golden Horse Award for Best Original Screenplay. The next year, he and  Edward Yang shared the 1987 Asia-Pacific Film Festival Award for best screenplay after co-writing Terrorizers. Hsiao Yeh stated in 2001 that, while he was at CMPC, many of his superiors came from military backgrounds and films were often made according to Kuomintang-led governmental directives. There, Hsiao Yeh also met Wu Nien-jen, with whom he founded May Productions in 1989. Shortly after starting May Productions, Hsiao Yeh won the 1990 Golden Horse Award for Best Adapted Screenplay. Later that decade, he became a television writer and presenter. Hsiao Yeh worked for Taiwan Television from 2001 to 2004 and served as general manager of Chinese Television System from 2006 to 2008. He contributed to the book Touring Taiwan, released in 2008. Hsiao Yeh was the artistic director of the musical "Hey! Atiku", which was based on one of his stories and debuted in 2010, the first such Hakka production geared toward children.

Political activism
Shortly after Tsai Ing-wen founded Thinking Taiwan in August 2012, Hsiao Yeh was one of the first invited to join. Days later, he and another former CMPC colleague, among others, started the Five Six Movement, in opposition to nuclear technologies. A wide-ranging group that included Hsiao Yeh, Lee Yuan-tseh, Wei Te-sheng, Giddens Ko, and Kevin Tsai founded the Anti-Nuclear Fathers Front with the same goal, on Father's Day. In November Hsiao Yeh was invited to the Zero-Nuke Festival hosted by the Green Citizens’ Action Alliance. He was largely supportive of the Sunflower Student Movement in 2014. Hsiao Yeh joined the 2018 Taipei mayoral campaign of political independent Ko Wen-je as campaign director.

Personal life
Hsiao Yeh's son  is a writer and film director.

References

External links

Taiwanese male novelists
Living people
1951 births
Writers from Taipei
University at Buffalo alumni
National Taiwan Normal University alumni
Taiwanese screenwriters
Taiwanese male writers
Taiwanese people of Hakka descent
Taiwanese television presenters
Taiwanese anti–nuclear power activists
Hakka writers
Taiwanese male short story writers
20th-century Taiwanese short story writers
20th-century male writers
21st-century Taiwanese short story writers
21st-century pseudonymous writers
21st-century male writers
20th-century pseudonymous writers